The 2021 Ocean X-Prix was an Extreme E off-road race that was held on 29 and 30 May 2021 in Lac Rose, Senegal. It was the second round of the electric off-road racing car series' inaugural season. The final was won by championship leaders Molly Taylor and Johan Kristoffersson for the Rosberg X Racing team, ahead of Veloce Racing and JBXE.

Classification

Qualifying

Notes:
  – Team awarded 5 additional points for being fastest in the Super Sector.

Semi-final 1

Semi-final 2

Shootout

Final

 The race was red-flagged at the end of lap 1 to rescue the beached cars of JBXE and X44. It was resumed with a standing start with the second drivers. Only RXR's Johan Kristoffersson and Veloce's Jamie Chadwick were able to take the restart.

References

External links
 

|- style="text-align:center"
|width="35%"|Previous race:2021 Desert X-Prix
|width="30%"|Extreme E Championship2021 season
|width="35%"|Next race:2021 Arctic X-Prix
|- style="text-align:center"
|width="35%"|Previous race:N/A
|width="30%"|Ocean X-Prix
|width="35%"|Next race:N/A
|- style="text-align:center"

Ocean X-Prix
Ocean X-Prix
Ocean X-Prix